Lars-Erik Moberg (born August 7, 1957 in Katrineholm) is a Swedish sprint canoer who competed in the 1980s. Competing in three Summer Olympics, he won three silver medals at Los Angeles in 1984 by earning them in the K-1 500 m, K-2 500 m, and K-4 500 m events.

Möberg also won eight medals at the ICF Canoe Sprint World Championships with two golds (K-4 1000 m: 1982, 1985), two silvers (K-4 500 m: 1981, K-4 1000 m: 1987), and four bronzes (K-1 500 m: 1982, 1983; K-4 500 m: 1982, 1985).

References

1957 births
Living people
People from Katrineholm Municipality
Canoeists at the 1980 Summer Olympics
Canoeists at the 1984 Summer Olympics
Canoeists at the 1988 Summer Olympics
Olympic canoeists of Sweden
Olympic silver medalists for Sweden
Swedish male canoeists
Olympic medalists in canoeing
ICF Canoe Sprint World Championships medalists in kayak
Medalists at the 1984 Summer Olympics
Sportspeople from Södermanland County